Route 327 is a provincial highway located in the Laurentides region of Quebec. The 90-kilometer highway runs from St-André-d'Argenteuil at the junction of Route 344 to Mont-Tremblant just west of the Provincial Park of the same name. The route serves as the main connection between Argenteuil county and the popular tourist region of the Upper Laurentides. In Lachute it is briefly concurrent with Highway 148 (across a bridge). It is also concurrent with Route 364 between Weir and Arundel. Significant portions of this highway are meandering and have a maximum speed limit of 70 km/h.

Municipalities along Route 327
 Saint-Andre-d'Argenteuil
 Lachute
 Brownsburg-Chatham
 Grenville-sur-la-Rouge
 Harrington
 Montcalm
 Arundel
 Mont-Tremblant

Major intersections

See also
 List of Quebec provincial highways

References

External links
 Official Road Network Map (Transports Quebec) 
 Route 327 on Google Maps

327